Marion Township is one of the twelve townships of Allen County, Ohio, United States. As of the 2010 census, the population was 6,715.

Geography
Located in the northwestern corner of the county, it borders the following townships:
Jennings Township, Putnam County - north
Sugar Creek Township, Putnam County - northeast corner
Sugar Creek Township - east
American Township - southeast corner
Amanda Township - south
Spencer Township - southwest
Jennings Township, Van Wert County - west
Washington Township, Van Wert County - northwest

Part of the city of Delphos is located in northwestern Marion Township.

Name and history
It is one of twelve Marion Townships statewide.

Government
The township is governed by a three-member board of trustees, who are elected in November of odd-numbered years to a four-year term beginning on the following January 1. Two are elected in the year after the presidential election and one is elected in the year before it. There is also an elected township fiscal officer, who serves a four-year term beginning on April 1 of the year after the election, which is held in November of the year before the presidential election. Vacancies in the fiscal officership or on the board of trustees are filled by the remaining trustees.

References

External links
Allen County website

Townships in Allen County, Ohio
Townships in Ohio